Yao Guang (March 1921 – October 25, 2003) was a Chinese diplomat. He was born in Xiyang County, Shanxi. He was Ambassador of the People's Republic of China to the Dominion of Ceylon (now Sri Lanka) (1966–1969), Poland (1970–1971), Canada (1972–1973), Mexico (1973–1977), Egypt (1977–1980), Djibouti (1979–1982) and France (1980–1982). He was a member of the Standing Committee of the 7th National People's Congress (1988–1993).

References

1921 births
2003 deaths
Ambassadors of China to Sri Lanka
Ambassadors of China to Poland
Ambassadors of China to Canada
Ambassadors of China to Mexico
Ambassadors of China to Egypt
Ambassadors of China to Djibouti
Ambassadors of China to France
Members of the Standing Committee of the 7th National People's Congress
Vice-ministers of the Ministry of Foreign Affairs of the People's Republic of China
People from Xiyang County
Chinese Communist Party politicians from Shanxi
People's Republic of China politicians from Shanxi
Politicians from Jinzhong